Artem Ihorovych Polyarus (born 5 July 1992) is a Ukrainian professional footballer  who plays as a left midfielder for Polish club Bruk-Bet Termalica.

Club career
He is the product of FC Ametyst Oleksandria sportive school and his first trainer was Ihor Kostyra.

While playing for his home team FC Oleksandriya, during 2017–18 season in November 2017 Polyarus was recognized as a player of the month in the Ukrainian Premier League.

On 20 June 2019, he signed with the Russian Football National League club FC Khimki.

On 1 October 2020, he signed a three-year contract with FC Akhmat Grozny. He left Akhmat by mutual consent on 3 March 2022.

On 15 March 2022, Polyarus signed with Bruk-Bet Termalica in Poland.

Career statistics

References

External links 
 
 

1992 births
People from Oleksandriia
Living people
Ukrainian footballers
Ukraine youth international footballers
Ukraine under-21 international footballers
Association football midfielders
FC Oleksandriya players
FC Dynamo-2 Kyiv players
FC Khimki players
FC Akhmat Grozny players
Bruk-Bet Termalica Nieciecza players
Ukrainian First League players
Ukrainian Premier League players
Russian First League players
Russian Premier League players
Ekstraklasa players
Ukrainian expatriate footballers
Expatriate footballers in Russia
Ukrainian expatriate sportspeople in Russia
Expatriate footballers in Poland
Ukrainian expatriate sportspeople in Poland
Sportspeople from Kirovohrad Oblast